Pasiones is an American pay television channel owned by Florida-based Hemisphere Media Group which was launched in 2008. The channel airs Spanish-language and dubbed telenovelas and series 24 hours a day.

Operating channels 
 Pasiones USA - Available in the mainland United States and Cuba.
 Pasiones Latin America and Europe - Available in Argentina, Bolivia, Central America, Chile, Colombia, Dominican Republic, Ecuador, Mexico, Paraguay, Peru, Uruguay, Venezuela, Puerto Rico, Spain, Portugal, Andorra, France, Italy, Germany, Austria, Switzerland, Netherlands, Flanders, Poland, United Kingdom and Ireland.

References

External links 
  

Television networks in the United States
Spanish-language television stations
Television channels and stations established in 2008
Latin American cable television networks